Dilshad Nahar Kona (born 15 April 1980; known as Kona) is a Bangladeshi singer.  She won Bangladesh National Film Award for Best Female Playback Singer for her song "Tui Ki Amar Hobi Re" in the film Bishwoshundori (2020).

Early life
Kona was a student of Moghbazar Girls High School and Lalmatia College, Dhaka. She studied Nazrul Geeti in Nazrul Academy.

Career
Kona was a member of the female band Angels Four with Nafisa, Rumana and Tisha during 2003–2006. It was formed by S.I. Tutul and  Shopon. After the band was disbanded, she started her solo career in 2006 with her first album Jamitik Bhalobasha. Her next album Fuad featuring Kona, with Fuad, was released in 2008. The album Simply Kona released in 2011 was composed by Sri-Lankan music director Iraj Weeraratne and Bangladeshi composers Bappa Mazumdar and Fuad.

Kona performs voice-overs on television commercials in Bangladesh. She hosted a show on NTV named Tumader Jonno Bangladesh. She was one of the seven singers of the official song of 2014 ICC World Twenty20.

Works

Studio albums

Compilation albums

Singles 

 Char Chokka Hoi Hoi also features Rahul Dev Kumar Pilli, Dilshad Karim Elita, Pantha Kanai, Johan Alamgir, Sanvir Huda, Badhon Sarkar Puja and Kaushik Hossain Taposh

Film soundtracks

Films

Awards and nominations

References

External links
 Official Facebook Page

Living people
People from Dhaka
Bengali playback singers
21st-century Bangladeshi women singers
21st-century Bangladeshi singers
Best Female Singer Meril-Prothom Alo Award winners
Best Female Playback Singer National Film Award (Bangladesh) winners
1980 births